Rosselló is a village in the province of Lleida and autonomous community of Catalonia, Spain. It is in the comarca (county) of Segrià.

References

External links
 Page of the City Council
 Government data pages 

Municipalities in Segrià
Populated places in Segrià